Medivac may refer to:

 Medical evacuation (Medivac is often colloquially used instead of Medevac)
 Medivac (TV series), an Australian television series